Frank A. Rose (born 1972) is an American foreign policy advisor who currently serves as  the Principal Deputy Administrator of the National Nuclear Security Administration at the  Department of Energy. Previously he served as the Assistant Secretary of State for Verification, Compliance, and Implementation from December 16, 2014 to January 20, 2017. Since 2018, Rose has been the co-director of the Center for Security, Strategy, and Technology in the Foreign Policy program at the Brookings Institution.

Biography

Education
Rose received his bachelor's degree in history from American University in 1993 and later a master's degree in war studies from King's College London in 1999.

Career
Rose began his career on the staff of then Senator John Kerry and was subsequently a national security analyst with Science Applications International Corporation. After graduate school, Rose was presidential appointee in the Defense Department during the Clinton Administration. During the Bush administration he served as a civil servant remaining in the Department of Defense as a policy advisor. After leaving the defense department, Rose was a professional staff member on the House Intelligence Committee and then the House Armed Services Committee. During the Obama Administration, Rose was the Deputy Assistant Secretary of State for Space and Defense Policy from 2009 to 2014. In 2014 Rose was confirmed as the Assistant Secretary of State for Arms Control, Verification, and Compliance. At the conclusion of the Obama administration Rose joined The Aerospace Corporation as their chief of government relations until 2018. In addition to providing commentary on nuclear and space issues, Rose has testified before Congress as an expert witness. Additionally, Rose has also served as an Adjunct Assistant Professor in the Security Studies Program at Georgetown University.

On April 22, 2021, President Biden announced his intent to nominate Rose to be the Principal Deputy Administrator for National Nuclear Security at the Department of Energy. He appeared before the Senate Committee on Armed Services on May 27, 2021 and was confirmed by voice vote of the full Senate on July 29, 2021. Rose was sworn in on August 2, 2021 by Secretary Jennifer Granholm.

References 

1972 births
Living people
United States Assistant Secretaries of State
United States Department of Energy officials
Obama administration personnel
Biden administration personnel
American diplomats
American University alumni
Alumni of King's College London